Peter Horn (April 15, 1891 – June 26, 1967) was a German politician of the Christian Democratic Union (CDU) and former member of the German Bundestag.

Life 
After 1945 Horn participated in the foundation of the CDU. From 1947 he was chairman of the Frankfurt am Main district association. Horn was a member of the Economic Council from 1947 to 1949, where he was Chairman of the Postal and Telecommunications Committee and Deputy Chairman of the CDU/CSU parliamentary group. In 1950 he was a member of the Hessian State Parliament for a few months.

Horn was a member of the German Bundestag from 10 June 1950, when he succeeded Hans Schlange-Schöningen, until 1965. In 1953 and 1957 he was elected to parliament in the constituency of Frankfurt I directly and in 1961 via the Hessian state list of his party.

Literature

References

1891 births
1967 deaths
Members of the Bundestag for Hesse
Members of the Bundestag 1961–1965
Members of the Bundestag 1957–1961
Members of the Bundestag 1953–1957
Members of the Bundestag 1949–1953
Members of the Bundestag for the Christian Democratic Union of Germany
Members of the Landtag of Hesse
Commanders Crosses of the Order of Merit of the Federal Republic of Germany